Luke Jonathan Thomas (born 10 June 2001) is an English professional footballer who plays as a left-back for Premier League club Leicester City.

Club career
Thomas was born in Syston, Leicestershire and joined the Leicester City Academy in 2008 from local club Riverside FC. He made his professional debut in a 2–0 Premier League win against Sheffield United on 16 July 2020. He came on as a result of an injury to first team left back Ben Chilwell, providing an assist for the first goal, which was scored by Ayoze Pérez. On the 25th August, it was announced that he had signed a new long term deal with the club. On 29 October, Thomas made his European debut in the UEFA Europa League during a 2–1 win over AEK Athens replacing Christian Fuchs in 46th minute. On 26 November, Thomas scored his first Leicester goal in a 3–3 away draw against Braga in the group stage of the Europa League. On 11 May 2021, he scored his first Premier League goal for Leicester City in a 2–1 away victory over Manchester United, to be their first win at Old Trafford since 1998.

International career
Having represented England at U18 and U19 level, Thomas made his England U20 debut during a 2–0 victory over Wales at St. George's Park on 13 October 2020.

On 27 August 2021, Thomas received his first call up for the England U21s.  On 7 September 2021, he made his England U21 debut during the 2-0 2023 UEFA European Under-21 Championship qualification win over Kosovo U21s at Stadium MK.

Career statistics

Honours
Leicester City
FA Cup: 2020–21
FA Community Shield: 2021

References

External links

Profile at the Leicester City F.C. website

2001 births
Living people
People from Syston
Footballers from Leicestershire
English footballers
England youth international footballers
England under-21 international footballers
Association football defenders
Leicester City F.C. players
Premier League players
FA Cup Final players